Slobozia Bradului is a commune located in Vrancea County, Romania. It is composed of six villages: Cornetu, Coroteni, Liești, Olăreni, Slobozia Bradului and Valea Beciului.

At the 2011 census, of the inhabitants for whom data were available, 76.4% were Roma and 23.6% were Romanians. 66.4% were Pentecostal and 33.4% Romanian Orthodox.

Rogoz Monastery is located there.

References

Communes in Vrancea County
Localities in Muntenia
Romani communities in Romania